Deh-e Gowd or Deh Gowd or Dehgowd may refer to:
 Deh-e Gowd, Anbarabad
 Deh Gowd, Qaleh Ganj
 Deh-e Gowd, Rudbar-e Jonubi